Abbur is a small village in the southern state of Karnataka, India. It is located in the Channapatna taluk of Ramanagara district in Karnataka.

Abbur is situated on the banks of the River Kanwa. The village is famous for its divine spirituality. The place is a home to Saints of Vaishnava prophets and Mula-Brindavan of Sri Brahmanya. It is believed that Sri Brahmanya Thirtha, a great saint meditated for a long period of time inside a cave in Abbur. Before leaving for Brindavana, he passed the legacy to Sri Vysaraja and pronounced him as the head of the mutt. The mutt is now termed as Kundapura Mutt. There are many idols that are worshipped here like Sita, Ramchandra, Lakshmidevi etc.

See also
 Ramanagara District
 Districts of Karnataka

References

External links
 https://bangalorerural.nic.in/en/

Villages in Ramanagara district